Rapper Nicki Minaj has embarked on three concert tours, all of which have been worldwide. Her 2012 debut, Pink Friday Tour, which was worldwide and supported her first and second studio album, Pink Friday: Roman Reloaded, received favorable reviews from music critics. The Pink Friday Tour was extended with the Reloaded Tour. During the Pink Friday: Reloaded Tour, Minaj visited Europe, Oceania, and Asia. Following the release of her 2014 third studio album The Pinkprint, Minaj embarked on her next world concert venture, The Pinkprint Tour, to promote the album.

In 2012, Minaj was a guest on the Super Bowl XLVI halftime show, performing alongside headliner Madonna and M.I.A. their song Give Me All Your Luvin'. Minaj's European leg of her tour with Juice Wrld titled The Nicki Wrld Tour started in February 2019 in support of her fourth studio album, Queen.

Concert tours

Co-headlining concert tours

Concerts

As featured act

Promotional tours

Televised live performances

References

External links
 Nicki Minaj's official website

Minaj
Nicki Minaj concert tours